Mary Alice "Marty" LeGrow (born 1981 in Olathe, Kansas, United States), better known by her pen name M. Alice LeGrow, is an American alternative comics artist, best known for her gothic, dark fantasy graphic novel series Bizenghast.  

Her 2003 short story "Nickolai", about a grieving only child and the ghost she befriends, won a runner-up place in publisher Tokyopop's Rising Stars of Manga competition. She successfully pitched Bizenghast to the Tokyopop editors, and worked on the eight-volume series from 2004 to 2011. Set in the eponymous New England town, it focuses on a schizophrenic orphan who finds herself tasked with returning each night to a mausoleum and appeasing the ghosts within it. Published from 2005 to 2012, Bizenghast has been translated into twelve languages, and received praise and criticism from reviewers.

Life and career
Mary Alice LeGrow was born in 1981, in Olathe, Kansas, United States. Growing up in the city of Wiesbaden in southwestern Germany, LeGrow did not have an interest in comics, as they were not readily available there. She and her family moved to New England, the northeastern region of the United States, during her middle-school years, and in her first year of high school, learned about comics and anime (Japanese animated cartoons). She attended Savannah College of Art and Design, from which she  graduated in 2003 with a Bachelor of Fine Arts in Sequential Art in 2003. Her artistic style was influenced by Kenji Tsuruta, Gustave Doré, Aubrey Beardsley, Will Eisner, and Japanese manga.

At the 2003 Otakon, an anime convention in Baltimore, Maryland, LeGrow heard about Tokyopop's Rising Stars of Manga competition from her friend Christy Lijewski. She entered a short piece entitled "Nikolai" in the contest, won a runner-up place in the competition and appeared in the 2003 Rising Stars of Manga comic anthology.  This was the introduction of her work to the publisher TOKYOPOP.

Following her successful pitch of her gothic, dark fantasy graphic novel series Bizenghast to the editors at Tokyopop, she began work on the series in 2004 and completed the final, eighth volume in 2011. Set in the eponymous New England town, it centers on Dinah Wherever, a schizophrenic orphan, and her only friend Vincent Monroe. Dinah finds herself tasked with returning each night to a mausoleum and appeasing the ghosts within.

LeGrow described Bizenghast as "about life, death and fabulous outfits (not in that order)", and notes the presence of religious themes.

Tokyopop published the first seven volumes of Bizenghast from 2005 to 2010, with the final volume published in July 2012 through an agreement with Right Stuf. Additionally, the series is distributed in New Zealand and Australia by Madman Entertainment, and has been translated into twelve languages, among them Hungarian, German, and Finnish. Bizenghast received praise and criticism from reviewers. The September 2005 issue of Teen People listed Bizenghast as the Hot Book of the Month. Sheena McNeil of Sequential Tart praised the first volume as "a highly enjoyable read". IGN's KJB praised it as "one of the most interesting manga to come alone in some time". In contrast, Anime News Network's Zac Bertschy considered it "one of the weaker entries in Tokyopop's fledgling OEL manga line". David Welsh wrote: "It’s got a handle on the cosmetics, but central elements of story and character are vague and underdeveloped."

On March 27, 2012, LeGrow announced a Kickstarter project for a self-published graphic novel series titled The Elephant Book, which she described as "about the power of human imagination and invention." According to LeGrow, her project has received a favorable response. Set in Philadelphia, Pennsylvania, The Elephant Book focuses on Williams and Fairfax, who find themselves caught between two rival organizations: Artifex and the Free Will Society. She chose Philadelphia as the initial setting of the series, because she felt that the city was "often overlooked as a setting" in comics. For her goal of creating a "really rich backdrop to every scene," she researched and photographed various locations in Philadelphia, including the historical prison Eastern State Penitentiary.

Reviewers have discussed her artistic style. Johanna Draper Carlson, a reviewer for Publishers Weekly, described LeGrow's art as reminiscent of those of "some classic fantasy indy comics, perhaps (for example) the work of Teri Sue Wood." In a review of the first volume of Bizenghast, another reviewer for Publishers Weekly wrote that LeGrow drew her backgrounds in the style of German expressionism. In her review of the Bizenghast artbook, Mania Entertainment's Danielle Van Gorder noted LeGrow's range of styles spanning "from a little bit gothic and a little bit grotesque to detailed work that pays homage to antique woodcuts."

Bibliography
Graphic novels & short stories
"Nikolai" (2003, short story, Rising Stars of Manga volume 2, Tokyopop)
Bizenghast(2005–2012, graphic novel series, Tokyopop, 8 volumes)
The Poison Apple Book of Stories(2010, self-published mini-comic)
Red Dart, silver-prize winner in the Line Webtoon BRAIN short-story contest.
Illustrations
Bizenghast: Falling into Fear (2007, artbook, Tokyopop)
Color Me Manga: Bizenghast(2007, coloring book, Running Press)  
Bizenghast: The Novel (2008, light novel, Tokyopop)
Stagtown a web comic,  spiritual successor to Bizenghast.

Notes and references
Notes
 
References

External links

1981 births
American female comics artists
American costume designers
Living people
People from Olathe, Kansas
Savannah College of Art and Design alumni